Ludborough is a heritage railway station in Ludborough, Lincolnshire, England, which is the base of the Lincolnshire Wolds Railway. The station, which was previously part of the East Lincolnshire Railway, closed in 1961 to passengers and 1964 to freight, but was taken over by the preservation society in 1984. There are proposals to extend the line further in both directions towards  and Louth.

History
The station was opened on 28 March 1848 and was originally named Ludborough for Fulstow although the for Fulstow was later dropped. Although its name is taken from the Lincolnshire village of Ludborough, the station is in fact situated halfway between that village and Fulstow. The architects of the station buildings were John Grey Weightman and Matthew Ellison Hadfield of Sheffield.

A third lower platform was later added in connection with the rail motor service introduced from 1905. Situated opposite the up platform, the rail motor platform is adjacent to a brick stationmaster's house which also comprised the booking office and passenger waiting room.

A signal box on the up platform which contained a 20 lever frame controlled the crossing gates as well as access to the small goods yard with two sidings on the opposite side. Ludborough had the most comprehensive goods facilities on the line between Louth and Grimsby, having cattle pens and a large brick goods shed; one siding ran into a loading dock behind the down platform. The design of the shed is based on the warehouse built by the Louth Navigation at Austen Fen. This made  the only intermediate station open between Louth and Grimsby . It closed completely on 25 May 1964 when goods facilities were withdrawn.After the closure of the line to passengers in 1970, the down line was removed between Louth and Hainton Street leaving only the up line through Ludborough to remain open until December 1980.

Preservation and reopening
In 1978, the Grimsby-Louth Rail Group was formed with the aim of reintroducing a service between Grimsby and Louth. They were unsuccessful in saving the line intact. After BR ripped up the track and destroyed all the buildings the group decided to rename themselves the Grimsby-Louth Railway preservation society. The society focussed their efforts into restoring the two sole remaining signalboxes on the line: Hainton street in Grimsby and Louth North. Both these boxes were left behind by BR as they had gate wheels in them which made it easier to operate the crossing gates for the last few years. Both the boxes suffered severe vandalism. In 1984, the Society took a lease from British Rail of Ludborough station site which became its base. A new company was formed with the intention of buying the remains of the track bed as BR would not sell to a society at that time. The new company was called the Great Northern and East Lincolnshire railway company plc. The signal box at Hainton street was destroyed by fire in the early 1990s. The frame and the gate wheel were removed and placed into storage at Ludborough ready for re-use. The frame is now in use as Ludborough's frame. The wheel is also in Ludborough box but will never be used in this location. Louth North was restored by the society but suffered continual vandalism. The box is a grade II listed structure and has been converted into a house but still retains its signal box look.

With the order in place, this allowed the company to acquire track, locos and rolling stock with the society supporting the company as much as it can. The company (now trading as the Lincolnshire Wolds Railway) have had to rebuild all of the station's facilities, including a replica Great Northern signal box in its original position, a two-road locomotive shed and a passenger waiting room which houses a museum and shop. In 1997 the level crossing was relaid and allowed access over the road for the railway to bring rolling stock that had been stored on the north side of the crossing. Between 2001 and 2004, the north (down) platform was developed with a toilet block, garden and running in board. By this point, the track extended north for a distance of ¾ of a mile. A major step for the LWR came in 2004 when HMRI approved the signalling for use. This then enabled the railway to run trains in the dark for the first time at Hallow'een. Tracklaying reached North Thoresby in 2008 and the first train for 47 years between the two stations ran on 26 August 2009.

The Lincolnshire Wolds Railway plans to extend the line in both directions to Louth via Utterby and Fotherby and via Grainsby to the former Holton-le-Clay station, recreating 8 miles between Holton Le Clay and Louth. The trackbed through to Waltham has been built over at Waltham and Holton Village halt and thus making it impossible to rebuild the railway to Waltham. The stationmaster's house has survived and is available as a holiday let. The goods shed also remains, but is in private ownership.

References

Sources

External links
 Ludborough on navigable O. S. map

Heritage railway stations in Lincolnshire
Railway stations in Great Britain closed in 1961
Railway stations in Great Britain opened in 1848
Former Great Northern Railway stations
John Grey Weightman railway stations
Matthew Ellison Hadfield railway stations